Ding Yi Music Company (previously known as Arts Sphere Chamber Ensemble), established in 2007, is a Chinese chamber orchestra based in Singapore.
The ensemble consists of both full-time and part-time musicians, most having attended professional training at the Nanyang Academy of Fine Arts. The ensemble’s repertoire ranges from traditional Chinese music to contemporary avant-garde interpretations and cross-genre works.

Ding Yi has been named "one of Singapore’s most dynamic and successful ensembles". Their performances have been described as "inspirational and aspirational" and their music "invigorating and inspiring".

Accolades

As of 2014, the ensemble has accumulated the following accolades:

- Silver Award at the 2011 28th Shanghai Spring International Music Festival

- Champion at the 2009 Llangollen International Musical Eisteddfod (Wales, United Kingdom)

- First Prize at the 2008 Singapore National Arts Council Chinese Music Competition

The ensemble has also participated in several music festivals, including the 4th ASEAN Festival of the Arts in Philippines in 2010, the ASEAN Arts Fest 2012 in Cambodia, China Odyssey 2013 in Beijing, and the Jogja International Performing Arts Festival in Indonesia in 2014. The ensemble is also a regular performer in the SPH Gift of Music community concert series sponsored by Singapore Press Holdings.

Key figures within Ding Yi

Emeritus Music Director
Dr. Tay Teow Kiat is the Emeritus Music Director of Ding Yi Music Company. He is also the President of the Singapore Chinese Instrumental Music Association. He has received numerous awards, including the Cultural Medallion in 1993 and the Long Service Medal (Education Service) in 1997.

Resident Conductor
Wong De Li Dedric is the Resident Conductor of Ding Yi Music Company. He is also conductor for the China Conservatory of Music Middle School Orchestra Class. In 2006, he took first prize in the National Arts Council Chinese Music Competition's Suona Open Category.

Notable Musicians
The ensemble includes several award-winning musicians:

Chua Yew Kok – NAC Young Artist Award 2013

Wong De Li Dedric – National Arts Council Scholarship 2014 recipient

Low Yik Hang – National Arts Council Arts Scholarship 2012

DYMC Composium

To promote new music compositions for Chinese chamber ensembles, Ding Yi Music Company has established the Composium, a triennial composition festival which includes composition competitions, symposiums and performances that encourages new compositions from local and international composers.

Chinese Chamber Music Festival

Ding Yi Music Company established the first Chinese Chamber Music Festival in 2013 where established ensembles from around the world perform in a three-day long festival. The second edition of the Festival will be held in 2015.

Education and Outreach Programmes

The ensemble does several public outreach and educational engagements to raise awareness for their music and the genre of Chinese chamber music. Some of these projects include the Feed Your Imagination (F.Y.I) collaboration with the Singapore Esplanade, and the Outdoor Fantasia concert series, which brings Chinese chamber music to the mass public.

Discography

Ding Yi Music Company released two music albums in 2011 - "Fire Phoenix" and "The Oriental Moon". They released a new album "Storytellers on Ann Siang Road" in 2016.

The debut album, Fire Phoenix, features a compilation of traditional and contemporary Chinese chamber music works. Their sophomore release, Oriental Moon, features a compilation of Liang Wern Fook's works rearranged for Chinese orchestras. Their 2016 album, Storytellers on Ann Siang Road, features commissioned and premiered pieces from composers such as Phang Kok Jun, Cao Wen Gong, and Chow Jun Yi.

References

Chinese music
Chamber music groups
Singaporean musical groups
Chinese musical instrument ensembles
Chinese orchestras